Paul Guillaume, Viscount van Zeeland (11 November 1893 – 22 September 1973) was a Belgian lawyer, economist, Catholic politician, and statesman born in Soignies.

Van Zeeland was a professor of law and later director of the Institute of Economic Science at the Catholic University of Leuven (Leuven), and vice-governor of the National Bank of Belgium.

In March 1935, he became the prime minister of a government of national unity (a coalition comprising the three major parties: Catholics, Liberals and Socialists). Given decree powers, he abated a national economic crisis by devaluing the currency and implementing expansive budgetary policies.

Van Zeeland's government resigned in the spring of 1936 due to the agitation of Rexism (a Belgian fascist party). On 24 May 1936,  a general election took place. The Labour party won 70 of 202 seats (minus 3), Zeeland's Catholic Party 61 seats (minus 18) and the new Rexists 21 seats. Van Zeeland continued as Prime Minister leading a government of national unity, composed of the three major parties (Catholics, Socialists and Liberals). 
On 2 June 1936, a wildcat strike among dockworkers in the Port of Antwerp broke out and quickly spread to other industrial regions without the endorsement of the country's major trades unions. It was characterised by the new tactic of workplace occupations. 
The Belgian strike was unusual in uniting socialist and Catholic trade union federations in support. Van Zeeland agreed to convene a National Labour Conference (Conférence Nationale du Travail) on 17 June 1936 to bring together trade union and company representatives. It brokered a compromise agreement including the introduction of a legal minimum wage, six days' paid holidays, and a maximum 40-hour working week for workers in particular industrial occupations. The strike formally ended on 2 July 1936. Van Zeeland was PM until 23 November 1937. After proclaiming martial law, his second government suppressed the Rexists. It introduced measures against unemployment, which helped ease the political tensions. Also during his second term, Belgium gave up its military alliance with France and reverted to its traditional "neutrality" policy, now dubbed a "policy of independence". 
In spring 1937, the rexist Léon Degrelle blamed him for having received money from the Belgian Nation Bank. Zeeland denied that but a commission found out he had received 330.000 bfr. Zeeland resigned and the king named Paul-Emile Janson as new PM. 

In 1939, Van Zeeland became president of the Committee on Refugees, established in London, and was made High Commissioner for repatriating displaced Belgians in 1944. In 1946, he was one of the founders of the European League for Economic Cooperation.

After the war, he served as Minister of Foreign Affairs in several Catholic governments between 1949 and 1954 and as economic advisor to the Belgian government and to the council of ministers of the North Atlantic Treaty Organisation. He was Honorary Secretary General of the Steering Committee of the Bilderberg meeting.

In 2013, to the consternation of his family, it was discovered that he had founded a Panamanian offshore company.

See also 
Belgian general strike of 1936

References

External links
 
 Paul van Zeeland in ODIS - Online Database for Intermediary Structures

|-

1893 births
1973 deaths
Belgian economists
20th-century Belgian lawyers
Belgian Ministers of State
Foreign ministers of Belgium
Members of the Steering Committee of the Bilderberg Group
Prime Ministers of Belgium
People from Soignies